Antsahamanitra Boarding School for Girls was a private boarding school for girls in Antananarivo, Madagascar. The school was founded by Johanne Borchgrevink, a Norwegian Missionary Society missionary, in 1872, and continued until 1912, when Borchgrevink and her husband retired and returned to Norway.

References

Girls' schools in Madagascar
1872 establishments in Madagascar
Educational institutions established in 1872
19th-century architecture in Madagascar